The 1994 season was the Minnesota Vikings' 34th in the National Football League (NFL) and their third under head coach Dennis Green. The team finished with a 10–6 record and reached the playoffs for a third straight season, but also failed to make it out of the Wild Card round for the third year in a row, losing 35–18 to their division rival Chicago Bears.

Offseason

1994 Draft

 Denver traded their 1st round selection (18th overall), 6th round selection (179th overall), and 1995 2nd round selection to Minnesota in exchange for OT Gary Zimmerman on August 23, 1993.
 Atlanta traded a 2nd round selection (40th overall) and 1995 1st round selection to Minnesota in exchange for their 2nd round selection (45th overall) and DE Chris Doleman on April 24, 1994.
 The Raiders traded their 2nd round selection (55th overall) and 4th round selection (125th overall) to Minnesota to move up 3 spot to the 52nd overall selection and draft LB James Folston.
 Minnesota traded their 3rd round selection (88th overall) and 6th round selection (180th overall) to Pittsburgh for TE Adrian Cooper.
 Minnesota traded their 4th round selection (119th overall) and 1995 3rd round selection (89th overall) to Houston for QB Warren Moon.
 Washington traded a conditional 5th round selection (134th overall) to Minnesota in exchange for QB Rich Gannon on August 20, 1993.
 Minnesota traded their 5th round selection (151st overall) to Kansas City for RB Barry Word.

Undrafted free agents

Preseason

Regular season

Schedule

Game summaries

Week 13: vs Tampa Bay Buccaneers

Standings

Postseason

Game summaries

NFC Wild Card Playoffs: vs. (#6) Chicago Bears

The Bears picked off Warren Moon twice while Steve Walsh threw two touchdowns, backs Raymont Harris and Lewis Tillman added rushing scores, and Kevin Miniefield ran back a Vikings fumble for a touchdown.

Statistics

Team leaders

* Vikings single season record (tie).

League rankings

Staff

Roster

Awards and honors
 Cris Carter, Led NFL in receptions
 Cris Carter, All-Pro selection
 Cris Carter, Pro Bowl selection
 Warren Moon, Pro Bowl selection 1994
 Warren Moon, NFL leader, passing yards, (4,264)

Milestones
 Cris Carter, 100 reception season (Carter finished the season with 122 receptions) 
 Warren Moon, 3rd 4,000-yard passing season
 Warren Moon, 5th 400-yard passing game (November 6)
 Warren Moon, 6th 400-yard passing game (November 20)

References

External links
 Vikings on Football Reference

Minnesota Vikings seasons
Minnesota
NFC Central championship seasons
Minnesota